Darreh Dun (also Romanized as Darreh Dūn; also known as Darreh Dān) is a village in Howmeh-ye Sharqi Rural District, in the Central District of Ramhormoz County, Khuzestan Province, Iran. At the 2006 census, its population was 166, in 43 families.

References 

Populated places in Ramhormoz County